The Belize Tourism Industry Association (BTIA) is the largest tourism association in Belize. The organization was formed on April 26, 1985 and is governed by a Board of Directors and managed by a small secretariat.

BTIA advocates for issues that affect the tourism industry in Belize and provides a network and forum for addressing tourism related concerns.

On May 5, 2014, the BTIA filed a claim for judicial review in the Supreme Court of Belize against the Department of Environment on its decision to give the green light on Norwegian Cruise Line Harvest Caye Project.

External links

References

Tourism in Belize
Tourism agencies